Pruzhany Palace is a museum in the town of Pruzhany in Brest Voblast, western Belarus.  It is a nineteenth century mansion, at 50 Savetskaya Street.  The building is a monument of manor architecture from the Neo-Renaissance era.

Activity 
The museum has a rich collection on the history and art of the region.  About 8000 tourists  visit the museum annually.  The museum has more than 6000 pieces, mostly donated.

Architectural Ensemble 
The palace grounds include a two-storey stone house with two wings, and a reconstructed greenhouse.

Park 
A wide lane provides access from the town to the palace grounds, situated on a landscaped park.  The eight square kilometre park holds a variety of trees which include ash, alders, hornbeams, and oak.  It was designed by the wealthy Polish landlord Walenty Szwykowski in the mid-nineteenth century.

See also
 Ruzhany Palace, another historical Palace in Pruzhany district of Belarus
 List of palaces in Belarus

References

External links 

 Official website 

Palaces in Belarus
Buildings and structures in Brest Region
Museums in Brest Region